"Ganxtaville Pt. III" is a 2003 single by DJ Tomekk. The song is a follow up to Ganxtaville Pt. I and 2, both of which originally appeared on the album Beat of Life Vol. 1. The song features Kurupt, G-Style and Tatwaffe. It peaked at No. 5 in Germany. The music video features both an American 1920s and a modern urban gangsta theme.

Track listing

Charts

Weekly charts

Year-end charts

References

External links
Official music video at YouTube

2003 songs
2003 singles
Songs written by Kurupt